Brudzeń Landscape Park (Brudzeński Park Krajobrazowy) is a protected area (Landscape Park) in east-central Poland, established in 1988, covering an area of .

The Park lies within Masovian Voivodeship, in Płock County (Gmina Brudzeń Duży, Gmina Stara Biała).

Within the Landscape Park are three nature reserves.

References 

Landscape parks in Poland
Parks in Masovian Voivodeship